Hans Skarphagen (8 September 1888 – 10 February 1971) was a Norwegian engineer and NS politician. He was a professor at the Norwegian Institute of Technology. In 1944 he replaced Tormod Hustad as minister of labour in the NS government.

In the post-war legal purges he was convicted of treason and sentenced to 20 years of forced labour. He had formerly fielded in the 1933 Norwegian parliamentary election in Akershus but his party did not win a seat.

References

1888 births
1971 deaths
Norwegian expatriates in Germany
20th-century Norwegian engineers
Academic staff of the Norwegian Institute of Technology
Government ministers of Norway
Bærum politicians
Members of Nasjonal Samling
People convicted of treason for Nazi Germany against Norway